Robert Gates (born 1943) is an American intelligence analyst and university president.

Robert Gates may also refer to:

Robert Franklin Gates (1906–1982), American artist
Robert McFarland Gates (1883–1962), American engineer
Bobby Gates (born 1985), American golfer

See also
Gates (surname)